King George V School (KGV, pronounced "K-G-Five") is a coeducational international secondary independent school of the English Schools Foundation (ESF), located in Ho Man Tin, Hong Kong. The school has more than 1,900 students and is one of the oldest schools in Hong Kong. Students take IGCSEs/GCSEs followed by the International Baccalaureate Diploma or the British BTEC programme. There is a Learning Enhancement Centre (LEC) for students with learning difficulties. The school is one of three ESF secondary schools in Kowloon and the New Territories, the others being Sha Tin College and Renaissance College.

History

Pre-WWII period 
KGV is the oldest of all schools in the English Schools Foundation. It first opened in 1894 on Nathan Road, and originally catered for the children of British people living in Kowloon. At the time, the school occupied just one small building. It was destroyed in a typhoon in 1896, and Kowloon College opened in its place in 1902. A major opening ceremony took place and was attended by many of Hong Kong's elite, including Major General Gascoigne, the Apostolic Vicar of the territory's diocese Louis Piazzoli, and the Colonial Secretary J.H. Stewart Lockhart. The school was built using donations from Hong Kong businessman Sir Robert Hotung. The school was subsequently renamed the Kowloon British School, then the Central British School, and later King George V School.

By 1930, the number of students in the school had grown to 300. Wooden huts were built at the back of the school to create extra classrooms. The playground was only . The then-headmaster, Mr. Nightingale, asked for a new and bigger school site, which was acquired, and the site plan was designed by teacher Thomas Richmond Rowell. Classes at the new site began on 14 September 1936. The first headmaster of the new school was the Reverend Upsdell. The present school is still on the same site. The foundation stone for the new building was laid by Sir William Peel, the then governor of Hong Kong, and the building was subsequently named the Peel Block in his honour.

WWII period 
In 1937, the Japanese army invaded China and many European women and children were evacuated from Shanghai to Hong Kong. They needed a place to stay in the summer and the school was used as a refugee camp. As World War II developed past 1939, the government started to worry about the safety of the children and in August 1940 the government ordered the evacuation of European women and children from Hong Kong. Thereafter, the school site was used by British forces as a hospital. When Hong Kong surrendered in the Battle of Hong Kong, the school site was taken over by the Japanese and used as a hospital for prisoners of war. It is rumoured that the Pavilion was once used as a torture chamber under the Japanese occupation and that ghosts of tortured victims inhabit the clock tower and room P14, which is currently used as a Media Room. Dead bodies were also said to be buried under the school field, although, when this was extensively excavated in preparation for the construction of an artificial playing surface in 2002/3, no such evidence was found. When classes at KGV resumed after WWII, the back of the stage still had the Japanese military's Rising Sun Flag painted on its back wall.

When the news was received that Japan had surrendered, the Japanese general commanding the school left holding his sword high. As soon as he left, the school raised the British Union flag, probably the first to be raised in Hong Kong following the Japanese surrender.

Post-WWII period 
The school re-opened in the summer of 1946 and in 1947 children of all nationalities were able to join the school. Since it was no longer exclusive for British pupils only, the school's name was changed on the school's speech day of 1948 to 'King George V School,' as George V was king when the foundation stone of the Peel Block was laid.

In 1979, principal Angela Smith decided that KGV should join the English Schools Foundation, and the transfer was complete by 1981. KGV is currently the oldest functional school in the ESF.

Additional Information 

In 2006, KGV was the first school in Asia to perform the musical, Les Misérables: School Edition.

In 2009, musician Mika visited King George V School. He viewed the artwork based on his music (created by Advanced Diploma students) and helped finish a mural on the B-block wall, painting "I am not what you think I am / I am made of gold." He followed by performing Grace Kelly for the students.

A truncated body of a Spitfire fighter-aircraft was present in the lower south east corner classroom of KGV School up until the late fifties. There was also a cut-away R.R. Merlin engine on display with it. It was eventually stored in the basement of the "sports" pavilion, until the Air Commodore had it removed, restored and one year later it was placed at the Cenotaph in Central for remembrance day painted in the ''colours'' of the air commodore's fighter plane during the war. The story of the Spitfire aircraft at KGV was once a major "legend" that no one had too much detail about, although this story is now largely forgotten by the current student body.

Students and the House System 

There are more than 1,800 students of some 28 different nationalities enrolled in the school. Students are accepted from many ESF feeder primary schools in the English Schools Foundation including Kowloon Junior School, Beacon Hill School, and Clearwater Bay School.

The students are placed randomly in either of the four houses, unless the students have lineage in the school. If the student has or had family members enrolled in KGV, they are automatically placed in the same house as those family members.

The house system is the basis for school competitions (excluding inter-school events). Houses are named after prominent former faculty members.

The houses, and their associated colours, are as follows:
Crozier (green) – named after Douglas James Smyth Crozier, a KGV teacher who fought to defend Hong Kong in WWII, and whom went on to serve as the Director of Education of Hong Kong, served on the Executive Council of Hong Kong, and was an official member of the Legislative Council of Hong Kong; during the 50's and 60's.
Nightingale (yellow) – the headmaster who first asked for a new school building, which is now the current school site.
Rowell (blue) – a teacher who designed part of the current site of the school.
Upsdell (red) – the first headmaster to serve in the school building located at the current school site.
Form groups are formed vertically and horizontally. Year 7 has their own set of tutor groups, and then groups of around fifteen in the year group bands 8-9, 10-11, 12-13.

Curriculum

The curriculum adopted by KGV, as an international school, is significantly different from the system commonly practiced in Hong Kong.

Middle School Curriculum 
The Middle School Curriculum is designed for Years 7 to 9. All subjects (Art, Drama, English, History, Information Technology, Mathematics, Music, Physical Education, Religious Studies, Geography, Science, and Design Technology) are compulsory, and students must learn Mandarin and a European language (French, German or Spanish). In Year 9, students can choose to drop either language they are studying for Global Perspectives, or take double Chinese if the European language is dropped. A coherent skills based curriculum is being introduced in 2014.

In Year 7, students are not put into academically levelled sets apart from Maths and Chinese classes because it is considered as a "transition" year, offering a wide variety of "inquiry" opportunities, transitioning from the "PYP" inquiry format learning to KGV's Middle School Curriculum.

IGCSE 
In Years 10 and 11, all students follow a course leading to iGCSE (International General Certificate of Secondary Education) examinations in their chosen subjects. Some subjects are compulsory, but there is a choice to suit the aptitude and interest of students. All students are required to study the core subjects of English, Mathematics, Science (split into Biology, Chemistry and Physics as Single Award, Double Award and Triple Science), PE, and PSHE (Personal, Social and Health Education). Students must choose four further subjects by choosing one of the subjects from each of the boxes. Students cannot choose more than one Design & Technology subject, choose more than one European language, or study both Business and Economics.

The boxes are designed to be balanced and to ensure that students can build on their strengths whilst keeping their options open for the future.

IB Diploma 
Starting from September 2007, KGV replaced the existing British A-Level Program with the International Baccalaureate diploma, offering the Diploma Programme. All students have to complete the core syllabus, consisting of an Extended Essay, Theory of Knowledge and Creativity, Activity, Service, as well as six subjects, wherein subjects in First Language, Second Language, Individuals and Societies, Science and Mathematics are required. Artistic or creative subjects are also offered, though these are optional.

BTEC 
From September 2011 the school replaced the A-Level Programme (which was an option for students who did not want to take IB) with the BTEC International Diploma, a vocational course.

Sports

KGV is known for its sports from athletics to volleyball; games often take place within the school campus as the school is one of the few in Hong Kong equipped with an on-site AstroTurf playing field. In 2008 and 2009, KGV were back-to-back winners of the Bauhinia Bowl, marking it as the best co-educational sporting school in Hong Kong for that academic year. Overall, KGV holds the record for the most Bauhinia Bowls won by a co-educational school in Hong Kong, with its 21 wins placing it two clear of Island School's nineteen wins. 25 male and 20 female alumni from KGV have been prior winners of the Bauhinia Bowl sportsboy/sportsgirl of the year award. KGV's many sporting trophies are displayed in a trophy cabinet outside the assembly hall and records of individual and team accomplishments are preserved in a section of the school library.

Rugby
Rugby has been a traditional sport at KGV for a very long time. In the 2007–2008 term, the A-grade rugby team won the 15s, 10s and 7s tournament; this had not been achieved before in the history of the school. This team includes many Hong Kong rugby representatives and the 2010 Larry Abel award winner; Aiden Bradley. A single word, "MANA" (meaning 'pride'), is shouted out at every practice and match to build up confidence in team members.

The school has recently embraced female rugby. The women's team includes many Hong Kong Bauhinia U16 rugby representatives, as well as players for the Hong Kong U18 Development and U18 Nationals for XVs and VIIs. In 2013 the women's team won the cup against the Hong Kong Standard Charter Select team in the first Bill Williams 7s tournament with a women's section.

Cricket
Cricket has been a popular sport with KGV students for many years, with strong Junior and Senior teams. The KGV Junior Boys won the Hong Kong Schools league in May 2018.

Football
Football has been a traditional sport at KGV for a long time.

The school often takes part in the Jing Ying Inter-School Football Tournament which is regarded as the elite football tournament within Hong Kong with the best school teams participating. The B-grade boys KGV team won the HKSSF championship in the 2018–2019 season.

Girls' Lacrosse
Girls' Lacrosse was introduced in 2011. In May 2012, the KGV Girls' Lacrosse Team joined the Hong Kong Lacrosse League, which was between two adult teams and HKIS.

Basketball

The season of 2011–2012, KGV A-grade boys' basketball team had won the HKSSF Division 3 basketball championship, it was first time for KGV basketball to win a championship.

Netball
The netball team at KGV has been one of the school's best performing athletic teams. The teams are divided according to A, B, C grade depending on the player's age.

Swimming
The girls and boys swimming teams compete separately in the annual Hong Kong Schools Sports Foundation (HKSSF) interschool competition, with the girls team achieving a promotion to the Division 1 competition in 2018 and the boys team continuing to perform strongly in Division 2. KGV has produced many swimmers who have won podium places in their events at the HKSSF swimming competitions.
Additionally, KGV swimmers regularly represent the English Schools Foundation at the annual Wheelock Swim for Millions charity race organised by the community chest. 2015 marked KGV's best showing in the competition with the boys opens team winning the school relay and the overall competition while the staff team came third in the corporate relay.

Facilities

Buildings

Peel Block

Completed in 1937, this block is named after Sir William Peel, the Governor of Hong Kong from 1930 to 1935. His name can be found on the foundation stone at the north-east corner of the building, it was personally laid there by the governor himself. This is the first block built on the present school site. It is protected under Hong Kong law because of its age and historical significance. The building's plan view is shaped like the letter E and has two storeys. The Peel Block is the administrative centre of KGV, it currently houses the School Hall, a gym, an archive room, equipment storage rooms, the Middle School Office, a reprographics room, the Learning Resource Centre, SSC rooms, the school's PTSA shop, the staff room and offices on the ground floor, and only one media classroom.

Since the KGV site was used as a hospital and a dungeon by the Japanese in World War II, there are many rumours about this block. Many have said that the former computer room is haunted and was a torture chamber during the Japanese Occupation, while others say that footsteps can be heard on the Peel Block's roof (or along the upper floor) at night. These rumours entertain the students in the school and make KGV a very unique place for both students and teachers.

The Hall, located in the centre of this block, has hardwood flooring in the centre and marble flooring on the side walkways and up halfway along the wall. At the front of the hall is the stage, and to the rear, there is a second balcony level. The hall is outfitted with advanced sound and lighting equipment, and used for events ranging from weekly Assembly to Speech Day (a award ceremony for Year 9s and above) to music and dance competitions. Before the 2013 construction of the Science Block and the Performing Arts Block, the building mainly housed science classrooms.

Hall

The Hall, located in the centre of the Peel Block, has hardwood flooring in the centre and marble flooring on the side walkways and up halfway along the wall. It is used for events ranging from assemblies, Speech Day, to music and dance competitions. The large hall is two stories tall, and includes a terraced balcony at the rear, for additional seating. Traditionally, manned theatrical (projection) lighting was staged at either end of the balcony's front rail/wall, often with a central "spotlight", for theatrical and/or orchestral recital performance evenings; video cameras on tripods were also set up here during the 80s and 90s, for filming many of KGVs traditional and other events.

Annex Block (AN)
Completed: 1982

Relocated: 2011

Demolished: 2013

The Annex Block housed two classrooms on the ground floor and two on the second floor. These classrooms were used exclusively for teaching Chinese and Spanish. However, this building has now been demolished and in its place stands the new science block. A second Annex block was situated next to the field on the current cricket field. That block was also demolished in late 2013 as rooms dedicated for modern languages are now available in the New Block; the space is used as basketball courts and cricket fields.

New Block (DT & Language Block)
Situated on the south side of the campus, the New Block, completed in 1964, is three stories tall and is currently home to classrooms used for Language Subjects and DT, a computer help centre, and the nurse's office. The block is incorrectly referred to as the language block by most KGV students and staff.

Activities Centre
Completed in 1983, the Activities Centre formerly consisted of two drama studios, a drama office, and PE changing rooms. The Activities Centre now houses one of three art studios on campus and three PE rooms.

Link Block
Built in 1984, this five-storey building links the New Block, the Peel Block and the Activities Centre, with covered walkways on connecting floors. This building houses DT, mathematics, English classrooms, art studios, pastoral offices, and computer labs.

Jockey Club Sarah Roe Centre
The Jockey Club Sarah Roe Centre (JCSRC) was built in 1986 with funds donated from the then Royal Hong Kong Jockey Club and named after Mrs. Sarah Roe, an occupational therapist, who was a founder of the Child Development Centre at the Matilda Hospital. The first floor of the building used to house the Parents, Teachers, and Students' Association (PTSA) store. The Jockey Club Sarah Roe School, originally on the ground floor, was later relocated into the Senior Student Centre. Currently, the Garden Rooms are being used as a Learning Enhancement Centre, and the second floor as six classrooms that are used mainly for language oral exams and separate exam supervision; two of them are occupied by the student support team.

Sarah Roe School / Senior Student Centre / Vertical Extension / IS Block
Completed in 1996, the original building was erected on the footprint of KGV's two tennis courts, which were re-homed atop the building's roof. The Hong Kong Jockey Club Sarah Roe School (JCSRS) is housed on the KGV site, and occupies the ground, as well as most of the first floor of the building. This facility educates students with special needs across the English Schools Foundation, and is the only such unit in the entire foundation. KGV occupies the remaining floors. The remaining two floors are fully occupied by KGV and provide classroom spaces for humanities subjects, as well as staff offices.

Previously, the first storey was used by KGV, and it housed BTEC Art Rooms, while the second storey of the building formally housed the Senior Student Centre. In 2001, a vertical extension to the building was completed. This added a third floor to the building, providing ten more classrooms as well as one of the four new computer labs on campus at the time. 

Now called the IS block for the second to third stories, it holds one multi-purpose room and classrooms for Individual Societies

B-block
Completed: 1999

Demolished: 2014

These six ground-floor classrooms were meant as "temporary" classrooms, but as KGV grew, these classrooms became necessary and thus became a permanent fixture. Modern Languages were predominantly taught in these six rooms which occupy the "piazza" area encased inside the square formed by the Peel, New, and Link blocks. In 2014, rooms dedicated for modern languages opened in the New Block, meaning that there was no longer a specified use for the B-block. Thus, the B-block was being used for temporary Humanities classrooms, due to the Vertical Extension renovation. B-block classrooms were demolished in October 2014, making way for the expansion and renovation of the piazza area.

Science Block
Built in 2013, the Science Block is a five-story building with a roof garden. This building mainly houses science laboratories, but other facilities are also found on the block, such as media classrooms. The Guilford Lecture Theatre covers the ground level of the building. There is a link between the second floor Science Block that allows students to access the third floor of the New Block. There were also two balconies on the second and fourth floors, where students can look over the field. In Summer 2019, these two balconies were turned into Classrooms, where they were called Breakout rooms, with numbers BR4 on fourth floor and BR2 on the second floor respectively. They are used as media and multipurpose rooms. Other non-science related rooms located there is ME1/ME2 which are both media rooms.

Performing Arts Block
Built in 2013, the Performing Arts Block is a five-story building built on the former canteen area and PTSA store, behind the Peel Block and beside the Swimming Pool. The building hosts a canteen, the Music Department, drama studios and changing rooms. Similar to the Science Block, the Performing Arts Centre also features a rooftop centre, the rooftop garden includes a small amphitheater for any performing uses.

Pavilion
Built in 1940, this block occupies the south-west corner of the school field. Originally equipped with two changing rooms with showers (through the rest of the 20th century), they were converted into two classrooms (X1 and X2), leaving the storage and maintenance sheds on the ground floor. The classrooms have now been converted back into changing rooms. Although there is no conclusive evidence, it is believed by some students and teachers that the Pavilion was used as a torture chamber during World War II when the Japanese occupied the school, and traditional belief was that it was haunted.

Other facilities

School Field 
KGV's artificially turfed field is ESF's multipurpose sports facility. It has markings for various sports, such as rugby, football (soccer), hockey, and also has a long & triple jump track running the perimeter of the field. The field itself is 100 metres long, and is flanked on its school side by a 100-metre-long sprint track and seating facilities for students. Prior to the AstroTurfing, there was opposition to the use of artificial turf. However, huge amounts of money spent on maintaining the natural grass on the field's base of hard clay was uneconomic and impractical, and the field would become a large dust bowl after a month or two of use and students would often get injured playing on the field.

The field was reopened on 29 April 2014 after a HK$34 million renovation. On the opening day, 575 students broke the Guinness World Record of 'Most Participants in a Beep Test', previously held by a college in Australia. This is the second world record broken by the school, the other being 'Most People Planking Simultaneously' with 1,549 students on 16 December 2011. In 2014, the field was rebuilt and to celebrate, the school went for the world record of Most People Participating in the Multi-Stage Fitness Test. A then-record of 575 beep test participants out of the 587 participants who started successfully completed the required number of intervals. This record was ratified by the Guinness World Records until it was broken by AFC Harrogate in 2017.

Swimming Pool
Built-in 1979 the school's swimming pool is located behind the Peel Block. It is a 22-metre swimming pool with six lanes, normally in operation from April to November. As well as for sports, it used to play host to a variety of activities such as D-Day emulations by the history department and re-enactments of the Red Sea Crossing by the Religious Studies department; however these have now been cancelled. Also, Swim Heats in the school are normally held there. In 2016 some of the swim heats for the Swimming Gala were held in the pool a few days after the main event due to a thunderstorm on the main day.

Tennis Courts
The two tennis courts are located on the roof of the SSC (Senior School Centre). They are sometimes used during PE lessons and during events involving Tennis. The KGV Tennis team practices there. However changes to the PE curriculum has meant that the two tennis courts are virtually unused.

Future site development
There were plans to amalgamate King George V School, Jockey Club Sarah Roe School and Kowloon Junior School to allow the three schools to grow further and work more closely given the close proximity of the three schools. This project was known as the Kowloon Learning Campus (KLC). This caused over 100 parents to sign a petition against the KLC in 2015. The then-KGV Principal Dr. Edward Wickins was appointed as the executive principal of the KLC who often informed the students of KGV of the progress of the KLC. However, in 2017 the ESF Board announced that the same goals the KLC would work to achieve would have also worked with three separate schools. Hence, the project was scrapped, and Dr. Edward Wickins retired after twelve years at KGV that same year.

Notable alumni 
See also :Category:Alumni of King George V School, Hong Kong
Loletta Chu – the winner of 1977 Miss Hong Kong Pageant.
Anders Nelsson – singer, songwriter, music producer, and director of music company.
Kim Gordon – American musician, songwriter, and visual artist.
Michael Hutchence – lead singer of Australian band INXS. 
Martin Booth – author of over 70 books and poems, including Industry of Souls, Music on the Bamboo Radio, and Gweilo: Memoirs of a Hong Kong childhood. 
Dermot Reeve – England cricketer, known as an unorthodox all-rounder.
Tim Bredbury – Professional Footballer. Former clubs include Liverpool, Seiko, South China A.A., Sydney Olympic, Selangor and the Hong Kong National Team.
Kemal Bokhary – former Permanent Judge of the Court of Final Appeal 
David Millar – professional cyclist on the Garmin-Chipotle Team & Tour de France Stage Winner
Jason Tobin – British-Chinese actor known for his role as Virgil Hu in Justin Lin's Better Luck Tomorrow.
Victor Fung, GBS – Chairman of the Airport Authority Hong Kong, Li & Fung Group, the Hong Kong-Japan Business Co-operation Committee and Co-Chair of the Evian Group.
Aarif Lee, Toby Leung, Charles Ying, and Shiga Lin – Cantopop singers and actors from Hong Kong. 
Rowan Varty – Hong Kong rugby player.
Jaimes McKee – Hong Kong football player.
Brigadier Mike Stone – former chief information officer of the British Ministry of Defence
Perry So - former assistant and associate conductor of the Hong Kong Philharmonic Orchestra

References

External links

 King George V School

 
Secondary schools in Ho Man Tin
Secondary schools in Hong Kong
English Schools Foundation schools
Educational institutions established in 1946
International Baccalaureate schools in Hong Kong
Grade II historic buildings in Hong Kong
Streamline Moderne architecture in Hong Kong
1946 establishments in Hong Kong
Schools in Hong Kong